Graham County is the name of three counties in the United States:
Graham County, Arizona
Graham County, Kansas
Graham County, North Carolina
Graham County is the name of the USS GRAHAM COUNTY LST-1176.